Joseph Anderson Panton  (2 June 1831 – 25 October 1913) was a Scottish-born Australian magistrate and goldfields commissioner.

Panton was born in Knockiemil, Aberdeenshire, Scotland, the son of John Panton (of the Hudson's Bay Company service) and his wife Alexina McKay, née Anderson. Joseph Panton was educated at the Scottish Naval and Military Academy, developing an interest in drawing. He later studied geology amongst other subjects at the University of Edinburgh, but did not finish a degree.

Panton's uncle, Colonel Joseph Anderson, suggested that he migrate to Australia; Panton arrived in Sydney aboard the Thomas Arbuthnot in March 1851. He then went to the Port Phillip District. After farming briefly at Mangalore, Panton tried for gold without luck at Mount Alexander. Then Panton applied for a position as an officer in the gold escort and was appointed assistant commissioner in 1852 at Kangaroo Gully near Bendigo, Victoria. A year later he was senior assistant commissioner at Bendigo and then senior commissioner in 1854.

Panton investigated resentment against the Chinese gold-diggers and recommended a Chinese protectorate; this was adopted by Governor Charles Hotham in 1855. Panton had helped to organize the Melbourne Exhibition in 1854 and was a commissioner for the Melbourne International Exhibition (1880).

In 1858, Panton went to Scotland and then to Paris to study art with a friend of his, Hubert de Castella. On Panton's return to Australia, he was appointed warden and magistrate at the Jamieson-Wood's Point and next at the Anderson's Creek goldfields. Panton then became magistrate at Heidelberg, where he also mapped the Yarra Valley, naming Panton Hill. Panton's Gap where the road to Ben Cairn and Donna Buang branches from the Don Road near Healesville, Victoria derives its name from a small house he had there. He also named Mount Donna Buang which he first called Mount Acland but renamed it after learning the Aboriginal name. From Heidelberg, Panton was transferred to Geelong and moved to Melbourne as senior magistrate from 1874 to 1907.

Panton was active in the Victorian Artists Association and the Victorian Academy of Art which developed into the Victorian Artists Society. A fellow of the Royal Geographical Society (London), Panton was also vice-president of the Royal Geographical Society of Australasia, Victorian Branch.

In 1895 Panton declined the honour of knighthood but was appointed Companion of the Order of St Michael and St George (CMG). Predeceased by his wife, he died at St. Kilda, Victoria on 25 October 1913 and was survived by two daughters, one of whom, Alice, was a well-known portrait painter.

In 1882, the Victorian government botanist, Ferdinand von Mueller named a newly described plant from Western Australia, Eremophila pantonii in his honour.

External links
Birthday honours list, 28 May 1895 Panton, CMG
Obituary of J.A. Panton

References

1831 births
1913 deaths
Public servants from Melbourne
Australian cartographers
People from Aberdeenshire
19th-century Australian public servants
Companions of the Order of St Michael and St George
Alumni of the University of Edinburgh
Scottish emigrants to colonial Australia